The following tables list the banners of the Lithuanian and Polish forces participating in the Battle of Grunwald, (1410)

Poland 

The exact Order of Battle of the Polish forces is unknown. However, Ioannes Longinus in his Historiæ Polonicæ written after 1455 recorded 51 Polish banners, together with their descriptions, blazoning and commanders.

Unfortunately, this list also has some obvious errors:

 at the time of the battle several of the banners attributed to Poland were constituents of the Lithuanian army (e.g. Lwów, Podolia, Halicz);
 Coat of Arms of Lithuania (Vytis) was a banner exclusively of the Grand Duchy of Lithuania; 
 arrows, axes and horseshoes are typical to Lithuanian heraldry, but not the Polish one, etc...

It is not certain whether the list is complete.

Lithuania 
The sole source on the banners from the Grand Duchy of Lithuania is Jan Długosz. He counted 40 banners on the right flank of the Polish–Lithuanian forces, 10 flying the Columns of Gediminas and 30 flying the Vytis. The flags varied in the colors of the background, horse and its harness. Długosz listed 18 lands that supplied the banners: Trakai, Vilnius, Hrodna, Kaunas, Lida, Medininkai (Varniai?), Smolensk, Polotsk, Vitebsk, Kiev, Pinsk, Navahrudak, Brest, Vawkavysk, Drohiczyn, Mielnik, Kremenets, Starodub. One land might have supplied more than one banner as evidenced by Smolensk which provided three banners. That is all information currently available from contemporary sources. However, it is unclear how complete or accurate Długosz's information is.

Historians pointed out several notable absences from the list, including the banners from Volhynia (Lutsk and Volodymyr-Volynskyi) as well as Samogitia. It is unclear whether Medininkai mentioned by Długosz referred to Varniai in Samogitia or to Medininkai Castle near Vilnius. The absence of Samogitian forces could be explained by a diversionary maneuver: according to 27 June 1410 report from Königsberg, a Lithuanian force was attacking Skalva. Other historians argued that the Medininkai banner represented at least seven Samogitian banners based on the seven regions mentioned in the Treaty of Königsberg (1390). Długosz's list is also missing three banners from Moldavia and a Tatar contingent known from German sources. Historians stipulate that in addition to banners from territories there should have been banners presented by nobles, but Długosz mentioned only Sigismund Korybut whose banner he counted with Polish forces.

Some Belarusian historians attempted to divide the 40 banners by nationality to Lithuanian, Belarusian, Ukrainian, and Russian banners. However, such analysis is fundamentally flawed as it is impossible to determine how many banners each territory provided, how many men were in each banner, or what was the ethnic composition in each land. For example, Smolensk had rebelled against Vytautas in 1404 and 1408 and therefore it is unlikely that the three Smolensk banners included just local soldiers.

Historians express skepticism over the lack of heraldic diversity. Heraldic symbols of various lands, including of Trakai, Kyiv and Novogrudok, are known from contemporary sources, to have included the great seal of Vytautas. Historians suggest that perhaps the two heraldic flags represented gonfalons, e.g. the 10 banners of Columns of Gediminas represented forces from domains of Grand Duke Vytautas and the 30 banners of Vytis represented different territories.

References 

 Sven Ekdahl Die "Banderia Prutenorum" des Jan Długosz: Eine Quelle zur Schlacht bei Tannenberg 1410 : Unters. zu Aufbau, Entstehung u. Quellenwert d. Hs. : mit e. ... Klasse ; Folge 3, Nr. 104). 

Battles of the Polish–Lithuanian–Teutonic War